Olympe Audouard (March 13, 1832 – January 12, 1890) was a French feminist who demanded complete equality for women, including the rights to vote and to stand for election.

Born in Marseille as Félicité-Olympe de Jouval, she married on April 11, 1850 the lawyer Henri-Alexis Audouard (b. May 2, 1829). The couple separated in 1858, but was divorced only in 1885, shortly after the French divorce law (the "loi Naquet") had finally been passed on July 27, 1884.

Selected works 
 Audouard, Olympe (1867). L'Orient et ses peuplades. Paris: E. Dentu.

References

Further reading 

Faure, Christine (2003). Political and Historical Encyclopedia of Women. London: Routledge. 

1832 births
1890 deaths
French suffragists